Chikoida Mountain is a mountain on the Taku Plateau in northwestern British Columbia, Canada, located  southeast of Atlin on the east side of the Silver Salmon River.

Chikoida Mountain is a volcanic feature of the Northern Cordilleran Volcanic Province that formed in the past 66.4 million years of the Cenozoic era.

See also
List of volcanoes in Canada
List of Northern Cordilleran volcanoes
Volcanism of Canada
Volcanism of Western Canada
Volcanic history of the Northern Cordilleran Volcanic Province

References

One-thousanders of British Columbia
Volcanoes of British Columbia
Cenozoic volcanoes
Northern Cordilleran Volcanic Province
Taku Plateau
Cassiar Land District